Sze Tau Leng or Sz Tau Leng is a village in Fanling, North District, Hong Kong.

External links

 Delineation of area of existing village Sz Tau Leng (Fanling) for election of resident representative (2019 to 2022)

Villages in North District, Hong Kong
Fanling